Forrest School District 81  is a school district in Cochise County, Arizona.

External links
 

School districts in Cochise County, Arizona